Kenneth Scicluna (born 15 June 1979 in Pietà, Malta) is a professional footballer currently playing for Maltese Premier League side Qormi. where he plays as a defender.

Playing career
Scicluna started his career in the Luqa Youth Nursery at the age of nine in 1988. He played in all age groups from 15 to 17 and also in Division three with the same club. In 1997, he moved to Zabbar St. Patricks. He remained with the Saints until season 1999, scoring one goal.. In season 1999–2000, Scicluna joined Maltese Premier League side Birkirkara, where he made 130 appearances and won the championship twice. In season 2006–07, he joined Qormi on a four-month loan. He then joined Valletta. Later in the season of 2011–12, he was linked to Mosta FC but joined Qormi FC on loan.

International career
Scicluna has been capped 25 times for the Maltese Under-21 side. He made his debut with the national team in 2005 and so far has earned 27 caps.

Honours

Birkirkara
 1999–00, 2005–06 Maltese Premier League

Valletta
 2007–08 Maltese Premier League

External links
 Kenneth Scicluna at MaltaFootball.com
 
 
 Kenneth Scicluna at football.co.uk

Living people
1979 births
Maltese footballers
Malta international footballers
Floriana F.C. players
Birkirkara F.C. players
Qormi F.C. players
Valletta F.C. players
People from Pietà, Malta
Association football defenders